For Here or to Go? is a 2015 Indian-American comedy drama film directed by Rucha Humnabadkar and starring Ali Fazal and Melanie Chandra. The film premiered at the 2015 South Asian International Film Festival.

Plot
Vivek Pandit is an immigrant from India. While his visa was intact, he was hired as a software engineer at Fortune 500 company, Meridian Labs Corporate in Silicon Valley, California. However, when his visa is expired, he becomes the fighter against American immigration system in order to keep his immigration status and his job alive.

Cast

Reception
On Metacritic, For Here or to Go? has a rank of 56 out of a 100 based on 4 critics, indicating "mixed or average reviews".

Namrata Joshi of The Hindu wrote "Ali Fazal remains likeable despite all the mess surrounding him and Rajit Kapur as a veteran techie pining for India is all sincere in a film that he doesn't deserve to be trapped in".

Writing for The Hollywood Reporter, Frank Scheck commented "The subject matter's topicality doesn't provide sufficient compensation for the many dull patches in Rucha Humnabadkar's comedy/drama about a young Indian immigrant struggling to get his work visa extended".

Daphne Howland of The Village Voice had a different take on the film, her view was "There's nothing new about immigrants to America making compromises in their new country, but in the comic drama For Here or to Go?, the story gets a chai-infused, Silicon Valley-mired twist".

According to Tom Keogh of The Seattle Times "For Here or to Go? offers an insightful group portrait but lacks imagination in a romantic subplot and (except for a requisite Bollywood-style dance number) is visually dreary".

Eddie Cockrell of Variety pointed out that "Bhilawadikar's too-busy script nevertheless scores legitimate points", while Michael Rechtshaffen of the Los Angeles Times added "In attempting to address its many concerns, the film's agreeable, lightly satirical tone gives way to increasingly didactic dialogue and a stalling pace".

Awarding the film with 2.5 stars out of 5, Pallabi Dey Purkayastha of The Times of India wrote "For Here or To Go[?] is one of those indie flicks that have a good premise but lack depth in storytelling".

References

External links
 

2015 films
2015 comedy-drama films
American comedy-drama films
Indian comedy-drama films
2010s English-language films
2010s American films